The York Mystery Plays, more properly the York Corpus Christi Plays, are a Middle English cycle of 48 mystery plays or pageants covering sacred history from the creation to the Last Judgment.  They were traditionally presented on the feast day of Corpus Christi (a movable feast on the Thursday after Trinity Sunday, between 23 May and 24 June) and were performed in the city of York, from the mid-fourteenth century until their suppression in 1569.  The plays are one of four virtually complete surviving English mystery play cycles, along with the Chester Mystery Plays, the Towneley/Wakefield plays and the N-Town plays. Two long, composite, and late mystery pageants have survived from the Coventry cycle and there are records and fragments from other similar productions that took place elsewhere.  A manuscript of the  plays, probably dating from between 1463 and 1477, is still intact and stored at the British Library.

Plays
There is no record of the first performance of the mystery plays, but they were recorded as celebrating the festival of Corpus Christi in York in 1376, by which time the use of pageant wagons had already been established. The plays were organised, financed and performed by the York Craft Guilds ("Mystery" is a play on words, representing a religious truth or rite, and its Middle English meaning of a trade or craft). The wagons were paraded through the streets of York, stopping at 12 playing stations, designated by the city banners.

The cycle uses many different verse forms, most have rhyme, a regular rhythm with fairly short lines and frequent alliteration. The balance of critical opinion is in favour of several clerics being responsible for their authorship, one of whom is conventionally known as the "York Realist". It comprises 48 pageants that were originally presented on carts and wagons dressed for the occasion. In some accounts there are as many as 56 pageants. They told stories from the Old and New Testaments, from the Creation to the Last Judgement. The plays continued after the Reformation when in 1548, the feast of Corpus Christi was abolished in England. The plays were accommodated in to the new religious orthodoxy by cutting scenes honouring the Virgin, but were suppressed in 1569.

Traditionally, an individual guild took responsibility for a particular play.
Barkers (Tanners) – The creation, and the Fall of Lucifer
Plasterers – The creation – to the Fifth Day
Cardmakers – Creation of Adam and Eve
Fullers (preparers of woollen cloth) – Adam and Eve in Eden
Coopers (makers of wooden casks) – Fall of Man
Armourers – Expulsion from Eden
Glovers – Sacrifice of Cain and Abel
Shipwrights – Building of the Ark
Fishers and Mariners – Noah and his Wife
Parchmenters and Bookbinders – Abraham and Isaac
Hosiers – Departure of the Israelites from Egypt;Ten Plagues; Crossing the Red Sea
Spicers – Annunciation and Visitation
Pewterers and Founders – Joseph's trouble about Mary
Tile-thatchers – Journey to Bethlehem, the Nativity of Jesus
Chandlers (Candlemakers) – The Annunciation to the shepherds, the Adoration of the Shepherds
Masons – Coming of the Three Kings to Herod
Goldsmiths – Coming of the Kings: Adoration
Marshals (Grooms) – Flight into Egypt
Girdlers and Nailers – Massacre of the Innocents
Spurriers and Lorimers (Spurmakers and makers of horse bits and bridles) – Christ with the Doctors
Barbers – Baptism of Jesus
Smiths – Temptation of Jesus
Curriers (men who dress leather) – Transfiguration
Capmakers – Woman Taken in Adultery; Raising of Lazarus
Skinners – Jesus' entry into Jerusalem
Cutlers – The conspiracy: Pilate, Annas, Caiaphas, Bargain of Judas
Bakers – Last Supper
Cordwainers (Shoemakers) – Agony, Betrayal and  Arrest
Bowyers and Fletchers – Denial of Peter; Jesus before Caiaphas
Tapiters (makers of tapestry and carpets) and Couchers – Dream of Pilate's wife; Pilate's court
Listers (Dyers) – Trial before Herod
Cooks and Water-leaders – Second Accusation before Pilate; Remorse of Judas; Purchase of the Field of Blood
Tilemakers – Second Trial before Pilate
Shearman – Christ Led to Calvary
Pinners (nailers), Painters and Latoners (lattensmiths; brass workers) – Crucifixion
Butchers – Mortification of Christ; Burial
Saddlers – Harrowing of Hell
Carpenters – Resurrection
 Winedrawers – Christ's Appearance to Mary Magdalene
Sledmen – Travellers to Emmaus
Hatmakers, Masons, Labourers – Purification of Mary; Simeon and Anna
Scriveners (Scribes) – Incredulity of Thomas
Tailors – Ascension
Potters – Descent of the Holy Spirit
Drapers (Dealers in cloth and dry goods) – Death of Mary
Weavers – Appearance of Mary to Thomas
Ostlers (Stablemen) – Assumption and Coronation of the Virgin
Mercers (Dealers in textiles) – Judgement Day

The York Realist
The authorship of the plays is unknown, but analysis of the style allows scholars to recognise where authorship changes. One group of plays, concerned with the Passion, has been attributed to a writer called "The York Realist", and the name has come into general use. The eight plays concerned are
Cutlers – Conspiracy
Cordwainers (Shoemakers) – Agony and Betrayal
Bowyers and Fletchers – Peter's Denial; Jesus before Caiphas
Tapiters (Makers of tapestry and carpets) and Couchers – Dream of Pilate's Wife
Listers (Dyers) – Trial before Herod
Cooks and Water-leaders – Second Accusation before Pilate; Remorse of Judas; Purchase of the Field of Blood
Tilemakers – Second Trial before Pilate
Butchers – Mortification of Christ; Burial

They are all written in vigorous alliterative verse as are other plays in the cycle. The distinctive feature, apart from the high quality of the writing, is the attention to incidental detail in the story-telling and in the subtle portrayal of the negative characters: Pilate, Herod, Annas and Caiaphas. Playwright Peter Gill expressed the view that "If it hadn’t been for the York Realist, Shakespeare would have been a second rate writer like Goethe".

Modern revivals
After their suppression in Tudor times, the plays remained little known until Lucy Toulmin Smith obtained permission from the Earl of Ashburnham to study the manuscript of the plays in his possession and publish her transcription together with an introduction and short glossary in 1885.

In 1909, the York Historic Pageant included a parade of guild banners accompanying a wagon representing the Nativity through the streets. In December the same year a selection of six plays was performed as a fund-raising venture for St Olave's Church, York. The play cycle was revived on a much larger scale in 1951 in the York Festival of the Arts, part of the Festival of Britain celebrations. It was performed on a fixed stage in the ruins of St Mary's Abbey in the Museum Gardens and directed by E. Martin Browne. The music, written for the occasion by James Brown, was directed by Allan Wicks. The part of Jesus was played by Joseph O'Conor, (although to preserve mystique he was not named in the programme) and other roles were taken by amateurs. In the interests of comprehensibility, the text was abbreviated and modernised by Canon Purvis who went on to lead the Borthwick Institute at the University of York, and produced a modernisation of the complete text.

Following the success of the 1951 production, said to be "the most widely applauded festival event in the country, with over 26,000 people witnessing the Plays", selections from the cycle were staged in the same location at three-year intervals, lengthening to four-year intervals, until 1988. They have aroused academic interest and publications.  Usually directed by a professional and with a professional actor playing Jesus, the rest of the cast were local amateurs.  Ian McShane played Lucifer/Satan in 1963. Some amateur actors such as Judi Dench became professionals. Directors included E. Martin Browne again (1954, 1957, 1966), David Giles (1960), William Gaskill (1963), Edward Taylor (1969, 1973), Jane Howell (1976), Patrick Garland (1980), Toby Robertson (1984) and Steven Pimlott (1988).
The role of Jesus was played a second time by Joseph O'Conor (1954), then by Brian Spink (1957), Tom Criddle, (1960), Alan Dobie (1963), John Westbrook (1966), John Stuart Anderson (1973),  local York man David Bradley (1976), Christopher Timothy (1980), Simon Ward (1984) and Victor Banerjee (1988).

Meanwhile, 1975 saw the Graduate Centre for Medieval Studies at the University of Leeds co-ordinating the staging of 42 pageants on the Leeds University campus.

In 1992, the York production was moved in a modern production to the York Theatre Royal, with Robson Green playing Christ and a script adapted by Liz Lochhead. The 1996 production in the same place was all-amateur, with the part of Jesus played by local solicitor Rory Mulvihill, and the script shortened by Lochhead. For 2000, the interest of the Dean of York, Very Rev Raymond Furnell, led him to offer the use of York Minster for the most ambitious production so far.

York Millennium Mystery Plays
In 2000 a large-scale performance was staged in York Minster, as The York Millennium Mystery Plays, directed by Gregory Doran, with a script adapted by Mike Poulton. With Ray Stevenson in the role of Christ and Rory Mulvihill (Jesus in 1996) as Satan, the production was the most expensive and wide-reaching project in the history of the plays' modern revival. The first half began in heaven with the story of the fall of Lucifer, followed by the creation of the world, the fall of Adam and Eve, Noah's Ark (with impressive and memorable representations of the animals and the flood) and the story of Abraham and Isaac. From the New Testament there came the annunciation and nativity of Jesus, the massacre of the innocents, Christ's childhood, baptism, temptation and ministry, and his entrance into Jerusalem on Palm Sunday. The second half concentrated on the capture and trial of Christ, and his crucifixion, resurrection and ascension. The production ended, as is traditional, with the Last Judgement.

The production ran for a month, with a total audience of 28,000. Aside from the professional director and actor, Ray Stevenson, the cast was made up of amateurs, mainly from the York area. More than fifty children also took part. Original music was written for the production by local composer Richard Shephard.

2012 production
For 2012 the Mystery plays returned to the Museum Gardens, their home until 1988. The script was adapted by Mike Kenny and direction was by Damian Cruden of York Theatre Royal and Paul Burbridge of Riding Lights Theatre Company. The show involved more than 1,000 local volunteers working alongside theatre professionals in all areas of the production, including 500 amateur actors organised into two casts who shared the 30-performance run. The combined role of Jesus and God the Father was played by Ferdinand Kingsley, and Lucifer/Satan by Graeme Hawley. Reviews for the production were generally positive, with praise for the spectacle and stage design as well as the efforts of the volunteers.

2016 production 
In 2016 the plays were performed in York Minster from 26 May, the feast of Corpus Christi, until 30 June. The director, Phillip Breen, had previously directed for the Royal Shakespeare Company. The production featured a large step set by designers Max Jones and Ruth Hall, that was dissected by a thin gauze that reached to the vaulted ceiling, which was utilised as a projection screen by projection designer Douglas O'Connell.  Writer Mike Poulton and composer Richard Shephard repeated their millennium production roles. The cast had about 150 amateur actors and the sole professional, Philip McGinley, played Jesus except for the last four performances, when,  owing to his sudden illness, the role was taken by his understudy Toby Gordon who had, up to then, played Satan. This caused a cascade of understudying which was superbly handled by a committed cast. It also elevated Toby Gordon into the ‘Crew of Two’ with Rory Mulvihill as the only actors in the history of the plays to have played both Jesus and Satan.

2019 
In December 2019, the York Mystery Plays Supporters Trust (YMPST) created A Nativity for York directed by Philip Parr, the first of what was planned to be an annual Christmas production in the city. He created a script using the original texts from a selection of the eight plays in the Nativity cycle: The Annunciation and the Visitation, Joseph’s Trouble about Mary, The Nativity, The Shepherds, Herod and The Magi, The Flight into Egypt, The Slaughter of the Innocents, and The Purification of the Virgin. These were condensed into a one-hour play. Amateur actors and musicians gave seven performances from 12 to 15 December 2019 at the Spurriergate Centre, Spurriergate, York.

2021 
In July 2021, York Minster, the York Festival Trust and the York Mystery Plays Supporters Trust jointly produced A Resurrection for York to celebrate the easing of restrictions and a hope for a brighter future. This was an outdoor production in the Residents Gardens adjoining Dean's Park in York and followed the experiences of people following the crucifixion.

Waggon plays 
An experimental production using horse-drawn brewers’ drays and market stalls, was performed around Leeds University, in 1975.

In 1994 the Leeds-based historian Jane Oakshott worked alongside the Friends of York Mystery Plays, the Centre for Medieval Studies at the University of York and the York Early Music Festival to direct the first processional performance of the plays in modern times in York. The production involved nine amateur drama groups each taking one play, and touring it to five playing stations in central York using pageant waggons.

A production in similar format in 1998 featured eleven plays, and for the first time the modern York Guilds were involved with some of the plays, either directly or as sponsors.

Following the production in York Minster in 2000, the Waggon Plays were the only regular cycle performed in the city until 2012 when the static plays were revived. The Waggon Plays also used the Museum Gardens as a performance station maintaining the link between St Mary's Abbey and the plays established in the 1950s.

For the 2002 production management transferred to a committee of the Guilds of York: the York Guild of Building, the Company of Merchant Taylors, the Company of Cordwainers, the Gild of Freemen, the Company of Butchers, the Guild of Scriveners and the Company of Merchant Adventurers. Ten plays were produced with the assistance of local drama groups.

In 2006, twelve waggons performed in the streets, in conjunction with the York Early Music Festival.

The 2010 production featured twelve waggons, performing at four stations. At the same time the only known surviving manuscript of the plays was displayed in York Art Gallery.

Two plays (Creation and Noah's Ark) were performed on waggons at two stations in the York 800 celebrations in 2012.

The performances on waggons were given again by the Guilds in 2014, continuing the established four-yearly cycle. 2018 saw the plays return to the streets of York once more, this time with a selection of 11 plays.

Language in modern productions 
Modern performances use some degree of modernisation of the text, either by a radical policy of replacing all obsolete word and phrases by modern equivalents, or at least by using modern pronunciations. An exception is the productions of the Lords of Misrule, a dramatic group composed of students and recent graduates of the Department of Medieval Studies at the University of York. Their presentations use authentic Middle English both in the words used and in their pronunciation. They have regularly contributed to one of the waggon play productions.

Editions

The unaltered Middle English text
The first publication was that of Lucy Toulmin Smith in 1885. This was republished in 1963 and again in 2007.
A century later Richard Beadle felt the time was ripe for re-examination of the manuscript, and he published a facsimile edition.
Beadle also published a transcription of the text with notes and glossary. This included many minor amendments to Toulmin Smith's work, but no major surprises.
Beadle's 1982 text has been put on-line at the University of Michigan. Because this has been constrained to use a modern alphabet, the obsolete letters thorn and yogh, which are correctly reproduced in the printed version, here appear as "th" and "yo" respectively.
More recently Beadle has revised and enhanced his work into two volumes, the first containing an introduction, the text and musical settings accompanying the plays and the second containing notes, glossary and discussion.
Clifford Davidson of the University of Rochester has published an edition which is also on-line.

Edition in modern spelling
The version of Beadle and King contains a transcription of 22 of the plays into modern spelling. This is not unambiguously a benign process; where the modernisation involves the loss of a syllable it has just been dropped, which in general damages the scansion, for example is the Middle English word "withouten", which in this edition appears as "without". The Middle English ending "-and" for the present participle has been changed to the modern equivalent "-ing", but retained where the "-and" was required for a rhyme.

Modernised editions
The first complete full modernisation was that of John Stanley Purvis, Canon of York, in 1951.
A more recent complete modernisation is that of Chester N. Scoville and Kimberley M. Yates, in Toronto, in 2003.

Adaptations and related plays 
 The Mysteries is a 1977 play by Leeds poet Tony Harrison based on the York and Wakefield Mystery Cycles.
 The York Realist, by Peter Gill, is set around a 1960s performance of the Plays.
 Anthony Minghella's Two Planks and a Passion is set around a c. 1392 performance of the plays for Richard II. A radio production (starring Bill Nighy, Julia McKenzie, Julian Fellowes and Tim McInnerny) directed by the author was re-broadcast in 2008. A production in July 2011 in York Theatre Royal used three professional lead actors -  Emily Pithon, Jonathan Race and Michael Lambourne - and a large community cast 
 In 2014, The Flea Theater produced The Mysteries, directed by Ed Sylvanus Iskandar, a six-hour show featuring modern adaptations of all 48 original York Mystery plays by 48 modern playwrights, including José Rivera, Qui Nguyen, Amy Freed, Nick Jones, Kimber Lee, Mallery Avidon and many more.

References

External links 

National Centre for Early Music, York
History of the City of York with modern watercolour used for 2012 plays
York Mystery Plays: the Guilds' site of the cycle of Plays they perform on waggons
The website of the Theatre Royal's Mystery Plays 2012
York Mystery Plays Supporters Trust
A computer simulation of the pageant
location of 2000 Mystery Plays

Middle English literature
Folk plays
English plays
Theatre in York
Medieval drama
Festivals in York
Cultural depictions of Herod the Great
Christian plays
Plays set in the 1st century
Plays based on the Bible